Amy Maria Hellaby (3 February 1864 – 7 April 1955) was a New Zealand businesswoman. She was born in Birkenhead, Cheshire, England, on 3 February 1864. When her husband Richard Hellaby died suddenly, she took over the running of the business, which employed 250 people, and was at that time New Zealand's largest private employer.

In 2000, Hellaby was posthumously inducted into the New Zealand Business Hall of Fame.

References

1864 births
1955 deaths
New Zealand women in business
People from Birkenhead
English emigrants to New Zealand